Peter Tom (1964 – 5 November 2018) was a member of the National Parliament of the Solomon Islands. He represented a constituency in Malaita Province.

Biography 
He served as the Solomon Islands' Minister for Women, Youths and Children's Affairs in Prime Minister Derek Sikua's Cabinet until May 2009, when he was transferred to the position of Minister for Home Affairs.

References

External links
Member page at Parliament website

1964 births
2018 deaths
Members of the National Parliament of the Solomon Islands
People from Malaita Province
Interior ministers of the Solomon Islands
Women's ministers of the Solomon Islands